Bruno Franco Fernandes  (born April 6, 1978) is a Brazilian martial arts teacher (5th degree Brazilian Jiu-Jitsu Black belt)  based in  Montreal, Quebec, Canada.

In 2010, he founded Gracie Barra (GB) Montreal, a school of Brazilian Jiu-Jitsu, and became President of GB Wear Canada. He is also the regional Director of Gracie Barra Association for Quebec, Canada. During his martial arts career, he won multiple World Championship titles and received many awards and recognitions in international Brazilian Jiu-Jitsu tournaments such as the Mundials (Brazilian Jiu-Jitsu World Championships), Pan-American Championships, and Brazilian Nationals, as well as in local state- and city-sponsored cups.

Awards and achievements
Fernandes won 2 medals at the IBJJF world championships as an adult black belt—a bronze in 2001 and a silver in 2002.  From an early age, Bruno Fernandes has participated regularly in world, regional, national, state and city championships. A collection of his tournament successes are listed below.

Notable students

As Founder and Head instructor of the Montreal branch of Gracie Barra, Bruno Fernandes has been teaching many students the art of Brazilian Jiu-Jitsu. He is assisted by BJJ practitioners, MMA fighters and conditioning coaches including Ivan Menjivar and Olivier Aubin-Mercier.

- Georges St-Pierre, a MMA fighter and world champion, is a student of Fernandes. He was awarded a Black Belt in 2008 and a related first stripe in 2011.
- Rodolphe Beaulieu was awarded a Black Belt in 2011 after training with Bruno F Fernandes from 2006.

Local championships

2013: IBJJ Montreal Open middleweight Champion (age: 35).
2013: IBJJ Montreal Open category, Absolute Champion (age: 35).
2013: Australian National Championship, Champion (age: 35).
2000: São Paulo State Championship, Open category, Third place (age: 22).
2000: São Paulo State Championship, middleweight, Champion (age: 22).
1997: Rio de Janeiro State Championship, middleweight, Third place (age: 19).
1996: Rio de Janeiro State Championship, middleweight, Champion (age: 18).
1994: Rio de Janeiro State Championship, middle-heavyweight, Champion (age: 16).
1991: Rio de Janeiro State Championship, middle-heavyweight, Champion (age: 13).

See also
List of Brazilian Jiu-Jitsu practitioners

References

1978 births
Living people
Brazilian practitioners of Brazilian jiu-jitsu
Brazilian expatriates in Canada
People awarded a black belt in Brazilian jiu-jitsu
Sportspeople from Montreal
Sportspeople from Rio de Janeiro (city)